"Sleeping with the Light On" is a song by English pop rock band Busted. It was the second song that band members James Bourne and Matt Willis wrote together. It was recorded in 2002 for their debut album, Busted, and later released on 11 August 2003 exclusively in the United Kingdom and Ireland as the album's fourth single. It reached number three on the UK Singles Chart. In 2014, McBusted performed this song in an acoustic live session.

Background
"Sleeping with the Light On" was written by Busted members James Bourne and Matt Willis and produced by Steve Robson.

The song was heavily remixed for its release as a single; the first chorus is more forceful than on the album version. This "New Version" was also used for the song's music video. Among the single B-sides were a non-album track, "Last Summer"; a medley of Busted's first three singles, which was previously performed on CD:UK, and a live recording of "You Said No" with 40,000 fans singing the chorus. The song was performed on Blue Peter, CD:UK, Popworld and Top of the Pops Saturday.

Track listings
UK CD1
 "Sleeping with the Light On" (new version)
 "Year Three School Said No" (medley)
 "Last Summer"
 "Sleeping with the Light On" (enhanced section and video)

UK CD2
 "Sleeping with the Light On" (live)
 "What I Go to School For" (40,000 Bust fans chorus)
 "You Said No" (live)
 Enhanced section

UK cassette single
 "Sleeping with the Light On" (new version)
 "Year Three School Said No" (medley)
 "Year 3000" (demo version)

Personnel
Personnel are taken from the Busted album booklet.

 Busted – all instruments
 James Bourne – writing
 Matt Willis – writing (as Matthew Jay)
 Charlie Simpson
 Steve Robson – all instruments, production
 John McLaughlin – additional production
 Tom Elmhirst – mixing

Charts

Weekly charts

Year-end charts

References

2003 singles
Busted (band) songs
Songs written by Matt Willis
Songs written by James Bourne